Workers' Solidarity Alliance (WSA) is an American anti-capitalist, anti-authoritarian group designed to help establish member-managed organizations in the workplace and community. It was founded in 1984, created from an existing network of groups including the Libertarian Workers' Group. It is based in New York, and produced a print journal called Ideas & Action from 1984 to 1997. On May 1, 2010, the WSA relaunched the Ideas and Action publication in an electronic magazine format.

The Workers' Solidarity Alliance website states that the WSA believes "that working people can build a new society and a better world based on the principles of solidarity and self-management", and "that such a society will be brought about only by working people building their own self-managed mass organizations from the ground up". WSA argues that the fight against gender inequality, structural racism and the oppression of LGBT people are also part of the larger struggle for social liberation and self-management.

WSA believes that both capitalism and state socialism are based on the submission and exploitation of the working class. They argue that for the liberation of the workers, it would be necessary for the working class to take control of the industries in which it works, dismantle corporate hierarchies from top to bottom and create new institutions of popular power, based on the participatory democracy of workplace and neighborhood assemblies, and dismantle state hierarchies, so that most people take control over public affairs.

References

External links

Ideas & Action

International Workers' Association
Organizations established in 1984
Anarchist organizations in the United States
Anarcho-syndicalism